Zahrádka may refer to:

Places
Zahrádka (Plzeň-North District), Czech Republic
Zahrádka (Třebíč District), Czech Republic

People
František Zahrádka (1930-2017), Czech anti-communist dissident
Mathias Zahradka (1912–1982), Austrian weightlifter